The Dean of Kildare is based at The Cathedral Church of St Brigid, Kildare in the united Diocese of Meath and Kildare within the Church of Ireland.

The current Dean is the Very Reverend Tim Wright.

List of deans of Kildare

1272 - after 1279 Stephen (attempted to become  Bishop of Kildare after the death of Bishop Simon in 1272, but could not secure Papal approval for his election)
1500 Nicholas Conyll 
1521 Edward Dillon (afterwards Bishop of Kildare, 1526) 
?–1540 William Miagh (afterwards Bishop of Kildare, 1540) 
David Stubin 
1553 Denis Ellan 
Thomas Ellis 
1610,1615 Walter Walsh 
1625/6 Walter Cleborne 
1660/1–1675 Christopher Golborne 
1675–1677 John Worth (afterwards Dean of St Patrick's Cathedral, 1678) 
1677/8–1678/9 Simon Digby (afterwards Bishop of Limerick, Ardfert and Aghadoe, 1678/9) 
1679–1708 Samuel Synge 
1708–1725 John Clayton 
1725–1736 Sankey Winter 
1736/7–1745 Gabriel James Maturin (afterwards Dean of St Patrick's Cathedral, 1745) 
1746–1765 Philip Fletcher 
1765–1771 William Fletcher
1772–1782 Edward Ledwich 
1782–1787 Robert King
1787–1808 Dixie Blundell
1808–1809 Arthur John Preston (afterwards Dean of Limerick, 1809) 
1809–1834 Thomas Trench 
1834-1859 James Gregory
1859–?1890 Sir John Wolseley, 8th Baronet (died 1890)
1890–1913 George Young Cowell
1913 Edward Hardress Waller
1928–1938 Herbert Newcome Craig
1974–1989 John Paterson (afterwards Dean of Christ Church Cathedral, Dublin, 1989)
?–1995 Matthew Byrne
1995–2006 Robert Towneley
2006–2016 John Marsden
2016-2018 vacant
2018–present Tim Wright

References

 
Diocese of Meath and Kildare
Kildare